Piotrowo-Trojany  is a village in the administrative district of Gmina Boćki within Bielsk County, which is part of the Podlaskie Voivodeship in north-eastern Poland.

References

Piotrowo-Trojany